Landulph is a hamlet and a rural civil parish in south-east Cornwall, England, United Kingdom. It is about 3 miles (5 km) north of Saltash in the St Germans Registration District.

The parish lies on the River Tamar (which forms the county boundary between Cornwall and Devon) and the river surrounds Landulph to the north, east and south. Across the river are the Devon parishes of Bere Ferrers and Tamerton Foliot. To the south-east of Landulph is the parish of Botusfleming  and to the west the parish of Pillaton. The population in the 2001 census was 485, which increased to 527 at the 2011 census.

Settlements in the parish include the hamlet of Landulph and the bigger village of Cargreen which is on the bank of the River Tamar. The manor of Landulph belongs to the Duchy of Cornwall.

Features of interest in the church include the panelling of the Lower family pew (ca. 1600), some unusual bench ends, a memorial inscription on brass for Theodore Paleologus (d. 1636), a descendant of the Byzantine Emperors, and a fine tomb of Nicholas Lower, d. 1655. Another brass is a memorial to Elizabeth Lower, 1638.

Francis Jago Arundell

Francis Vyvyan Jago was born at Launceston, in July 1780, being the only son of Thomas Jago. (He afterwards adopted the additional surname of "Arundell".) From youth to old age Jago was imbued with a love of antiquarian study, and after his institution in 1805 to the rectory of Landulph he threw himself with avidity into the history of Cornwall. In the church of Landulph is a brass to the memory of Theodore Paleologus, descended from the last of the Christian emperors of Greece, who died on 21 January 1637, and an account of this inscription, and of the person whom it commemorated, was printed by Jago in the volume of the Archæologia for 1817, and reprinted in Davies Gilbert's Cornwall (iii, 365). This paper was afterwards amplified into Some Notice of the Church of Landulph, which was published in 1840, and a reprint of which, with additions by Joseph Polsue of Bodmin, was announced some years ago (i.e. before 1885).

References

Attribution

External links

Civil parishes in Cornwall
Hamlets in Cornwall